Boğaziçi Shipyard (Turkish: Boğaziçi Tersanesi) is a Turkish shipyard established in Kadikoy, Istanbul, in 1992. The company's head office located in Istanbul, Turkey, new shipbuilding facilities located in Yalova Turkey.

See also 

 List of shipbuilders and shipyards

References

External links 

 Boğaziçi Shipyard

Turkish companies established in 1992
Shipyards of Turkey
Shipbuilding companies of Turkey
Manufacturing companies based in Istanbul